The Little River is a tributary of Rakaia River, about  long, in the Canterbury Plains of New Zealand's South Island.

Wairewa marae, a marae (tribal meeting ground) of Ngāi Tahu and its Wairewa Rūnanga branch, is located at Little River. It includes Te Mako wharenui (meeting house).

Power station 
MainPower’s Cleardale power station, was built in 2010. Power is generated at 400 volts and transformed to feed into Electricity Ashburton's 11 kV network. Some water from the tailrace is used to irrigate , with the remainder returned to the river. The power station and penstock have been landscaped and are now barely visible.

References

External links 
 1951 photo of Gorge

Rivers of Canterbury, New Zealand
Rivers of New Zealand